The Baeyer–Drewsen indigo synthesis (1882) is an organic reaction in which indigo is prepared from 2-nitrobenzaldehyde and acetone The  reaction  was  developed  by  von  Baeyer  in  1880  to  produce  the  first  synthetic indigo at laboratory scale. This procedure is not used at industrial scale.

The reaction is classified as an aldol condensation.  As a practical route to indigo, this method was displaced by routes from aniline.

Mechanism

Note
In the English literature this reaction is sometimes called Baeyer–Drewson reaction, although the author of the original paper was spelled Drewsen.

References

External links
 Lab Manual
 Lab-synthesis of indigo

Nitrogen heterocycle forming reactions
Organic reactions
Name reactions